This is a list of actresses in Bhojpuri cinema .

A
 Archana Prajapati
 Akshara Singh
 Amrapali Dubey
 Anjana Singh
 Antara Biswas

E
 Eenu Shree

H
 Harshika Poonacha

J
 Jayshree T.

K
 Kajal Nishad
 Kajal Raghwani
 Kumkum

L
 Leela Mishra

M
 Meghasri

N
 Nagma
 Neeta Dhungana
 Nidhi Jha

P
 Poonam Dubey
 Padma Khanna

R
 Ramya Sri
 Rashami Desai
 Rambha
 Rani Chatterjee
 Rinku Ghosh

S
 Sanchita Banerjee
 Sheela Sharma
 Smrity Sinha
 Shweta Tiwari
 Swati Sen
 Swati Verma
 Shubhi Sharma

U
 Urvashi Chaudhary

Y
 Yamini Singh

Note
Apart from these regular actresses, many Bollywood actresses like Aruna Irani, Hema Malini, Jaya Bachchan, Juhi Chawla, Rati Agnihotri and Shilpa Shetty are also featured in Bhojpuri movies.

See also
Bhojpuri cinema
List of Bhojpuri films
List of Bhojpuri people
List of Bhojpuri actors
List of Bhojpuri singers

References

Bhojpuri cinema
Indian actors
Bhojpuri-language films